Route 611 is the main road between Nahri Saraj District and Kajaki District in Helmand Province, Afghanistan.  The southern terminus is at Highway 1 in the town of Grishk and the northern terminus is in the village of Kajaki. The road is approximately 100 kilometers long and passes through the town of Sangin. 

American Marines from the 3rd Battalion, 8th Marines were deployed in 2010 to provide security for the 100 km of roadway to ensure the completion of the project.

References

Helmand Province
Roads in Afghanistan